Newfield is a village in County Durham, in England. It is situated to the south of Willington, near Bishop Auckland. In the 2001 census Newfield had a population of 368.

References

External links

Villages in County Durham